Desert of Lost Men is a 1951 American Western film directed by Harry Keller and starring Allan Lane, Mary Ellen Kay and Irving Bacon. The film's art direction was by Frank Arrigo.

Cast
 Allan Lane as Rocky Lane  
 Black Jack as Rocky's Horse  
 Irving Bacon as Sheriff Skeeter Davis  
 Mary Ellen Kay as Nan Webster  
 Roy Barcroft as Henchman Link  
 Ross Elliott as Dr. Jim Haynes  
 Cliff Clark as Carl Landers  
 Boyd 'Red' Morgan as Henchman Frank  
 Leo Cleary as Dr. Stephens  
 Kenneth MacDonald as Bill Hackett  
 Steve Pendleton as Posse member 
 Roy Bucko as Posse Rider 
 Ken Cooper as Henchman Joe  
 Frank Ellis as Posse Member  
 Herman Hack as Townsman
 Lew Morphy as Henchman

References

Bibliography
 Pitts, Michael R. Western Movies: A Guide to 5,105 Feature Films.McFarland, 2012.

External links
 

1951 films
1951 Western (genre) films
American Western (genre) films
Films directed by Harry Keller
Republic Pictures films
American black-and-white films
1950s English-language films
1950s American films